1988 Soviet Second League was a Soviet competition in the Soviet Second League.

Zonal tournament

Zone I (Central)

Zone II (Volga/Ural)

Zone III (South)

Zone IV (Far East)

Zone V (Soviet Republics)

Zone VI (Ukraine)

Zone VII (Central Asia)

Zone VIII (Kazakhstan)

Zone IX (Caucasus)

Zone finals

Group 1

Group 2

Group 3

References
 All-Soviet Archive Site
 Results. RSSSF

Soviet Second League seasons
3
Soviet
Soviet